Schistolais is a genus of passerine birds in the family Cisticolidae.

It contains the following species:
 White-chinned prinia (Schistolais leucopogon)
 Sierra Leone prinia (Schistolais leontica)

References

Ryan, Peter (2006). Family Cisticolidae (Cisticolas and allies). pp. 378–492 in del Hoyo J., Elliott A. & Christie D.A. (2006) Handbook of the Birds of the World. Volume 11. Old World Flycatchers to Old World Warblers. Lynx Edicions, Barcelona 
 Nguembock B.; Fjeldsa J.; Tillier A.; Pasquet E. (2007): A phylogeny for the Cisticolidae (Aves: Passeriformes) based on nuclear and mitochondrial DNA sequence data, and a re-interpretation of a unique nest-building specialization. Molecular Phylogenetics and Evolution 42: 272–286.
Urban, E.K.; Fry, C.H. & Keith, S. (1997) The Birds of Africa, vol. 5. Academic Press, London. 

 
Cisticolidae
Bird genera